Dahod–Ratlam MEMU is a MEMU train of the Indian Railways, which runs between Dahod railway station in Gujarat and Ratlam Junction railway station in Madhya Pradesh. It is currently being operated with 69187/69188 train numbers on a weekly basis.

Route and halts

The important halts of the train are:

Average speed and frequency

The 69187/Dahod–Ratlam MEMU runs with an average speed of 37 km/h and completes 114 km in 3h 5m. 
The 69188/Ratlam–Dahod MEMU runs with an average speed of 40 km/h and completes 114 km in 2h 50m.

See also 

 Dahod railway station
 Ratlam Junction railway station
 Ujjain–Nagda MEMU
 Vadodara–Dahod MEMU

Notes

References

External links 

 69187/Dahod–Ratlam MEMU
 69188/Ratlam–Dahod MEMU

Transport in Dahod
Transport in Ratlam
Rail transport in Madhya Pradesh
Electric multiple units of India
Electric multiple units in Gujarat